Francesco Morosini (P431) is the second ship of Paolo Thaon di Revel-class offshore patrol vessel.

Development and design 
Italian Navy ordered the new MBDA TESEO MK/2E heavy-duty missile (TESEO "EVO"), a long-range anti-ship missilewith also strategic land attack capability. The missile will have a new terminal "head" with dual RF seeker (Radio Frequency) and, presumably, date the need to even attack ground targets, IIR (Imaging IR). Compared to the predecessor OTOMAT/TESEO, the TESEO "EVO" MK/2E has a double range or more than 360 km. Former OTOMAT is accredited for a range of action of more than 180 km.

Construction and career
Francesco Morosini was laid down on 16 February 2018 at Fincantieri Muggiano and launched on 22 May 2020. The ship had been expected to be commissioned in March 2022 but she entered service in October of that year.

References

External links
 Pattugliatori Polivalenti di Altura Marina Militare website

2020 ships
Ships built by Fincantieri